Albert Henry DeSalvo (September 3, 1931 – November 25, 1973) was an American rapist and suspected serial killer in Boston, Massachusetts, who purportedly confessed to being the "Boston Strangler," the murderer of thirteen women in the Boston area from 1962 to 1964. In 1967, DeSalvo was imprisoned for life for committing a series of rapes. However, his murder confession has been disputed and debate continues as to which crimes he actually committed.

In 1968, a film about the murders, The Boston Strangler, was released, with DeSalvo being portrayed by Tony Curtis.

In July 2013, DNA was matched between seminal fluid found at the rape and murder of Mary Sullivan and DNA obtained from DeSalvo's nephew, linking DeSalvo to the murder of Sullivan and excluding 99.9% of the remaining population. Authorities exhumed DeSalvo's remains later that month and confirmed the DNA match.

Early life
DeSalvo was born in Chelsea, Massachusetts, to Frank and Charlotte DeSalvo. His father was a violent alcoholic, who at one point knocked out all of his wife's teeth and bent her fingers back until they broke in front of their children. He would also bring home prostitutes and engage in sexual acts with them in front of his wife and young children. The young DeSalvo began torturing animals as a child, and started shoplifting and stealing in early adolescence, frequently crossing paths with the law.

In November 1943, the 12-year-old DeSalvo was first arrested for battery and robbery. In December of the same year, he was sent to the Lyman School for Boys. In October 1944, he was paroled and started working as a delivery boy. In August 1946, he returned to the Lyman School for stealing an automobile. After completing his second sentence, DeSalvo joined the U.S. Army. He was honorably discharged after his first tour of duty. He re-enlisted and, in spite of being tried in a court-martial, DeSalvo was again honorably discharged. DeSalvo served as a Military Police sergeant with the 2nd Squadron, 14th Armored Cavalry Regiment. Pictures of DeSalvo being arrested on February 25, 1967, show him in U.S. Navy Dress Blue uniform with petty officer third class (E-4) insignia on his sleeve. At the time of the Boston Strangler murders, DeSalvo lived at 11 Florence Street Park, in Malden, Massachusetts, across the street from the junction of Florence and Clement streets.

Murders

Between June 14, 1962, and January 4, 1964, 13 single women between the ages of 19 and 85 were murdered in the Boston area; they were eventually tied to the Boston Strangler. Most of the women were sexually assaulted in their apartments, and then strangled with articles of clothing. The oldest victim died of a heart attack. Two others were stabbed to death, one of whom was also badly beaten. Without any sign of forced entry into their dwellings, the women were assumed to have either known their killer or voluntarily allowed him into their homes.

In the fall of 1964, in addition to the Strangler murders, the police were also trying to solve a series of rapes committed by a man who had been dubbed the "Measuring Man" or the "Green Man". On October 27, 1964, a stranger entered a young woman's home in East Cambridge posing as a detective. He tied his victim to her bed, proceeded to sexually assault her, and suddenly left, saying "I'm sorry" as he went. The woman's description led police to identify the assailant as DeSalvo. When his photo was published, many women identified him as the man who had assaulted them. Earlier on October 27, DeSalvo had posed as a motorist with car trouble and attempted to enter a home in Bridgewater, Massachusetts. The owner of the home, future Brockton Police Chief Richard Sproules, became suspicious and ultimately fired a shotgun at DeSalvo.

Under arrest for his role in the "Green Man" rapes, DeSalvo was not suspected of being involved with the murders. Only after he was charged with rape did he give a detailed confession of his activities as the Boston Strangler, both under hypnosis induced by William Joseph Bryan and also without hypnosis during interviews with Assistant Attorney General John Bottomly. He initially confessed to fellow inmate George Nassar, who then notified his attorney, F. Lee Bailey. Bailey took DeSalvo's case. Though there were some inconsistencies, DeSalvo was able to cite details that had not been made public. However, there was no physical evidence to substantiate his confession. As such, he stood trial for earlier, unrelated crimes of robbery and sexual offenses. Bailey brought up the confession to the murders as part of his client's history at the trial as part of an insanity defense, but it was ruled inadmissible by the judge.

For his 1967 trial, DeSalvo's mental state was evaluated by Dr. Harry Kozol, a neurologist who had established the first sex offender treatment center in Massachusetts. Bailey engaged a plea bargain to lock in his client's guilt in exchange for taking the death penalty off the table and also to preserve the possibility of an eventual insanity verdict. Bailey was angered by the jury's decision to put DeSalvo in prison for life: "My goal was to see the Strangler wind up in a hospital, where doctors could try to find out what made him kill. Society is deprived of a study that might help deter other mass killers who lived among us, waiting for the trigger to go off inside them."

Victims

Imprisonment and death
DeSalvo was sentenced to life in prison in 1967. In February of that year, he escaped with two fellow inmates from Bridgewater State Hospital, triggering a full-scale manhunt. A note was found on his bunk addressed to the superintendent. In it, DeSalvo stated he had escaped to focus attention on the conditions in the hospital and his own situation. Three days after the escape he called his lawyer to turn himself in. His lawyer then sent the police to re-arrest him in Lynn, Massachusetts. Following the escape, he was transferred to the maximum security prison known at the time as Walpole, where he later recanted his Strangler confessions.

On November 25, 1973, he was found stabbed to death in the prison infirmary. Robert Wilson, who was associated with the Winter Hill Gang, was tried for DeSalvo's murder, but the trial ended in a hung jury. Bailey later claimed that DeSalvo was killed for selling amphetamines in the prison for less than the inmate-enforced syndicate price.

DeSalvo's papers are housed in the Lloyd Sealy Library Special Collections at John Jay College of Criminal Justice in New York City. His papers include his correspondence, mainly with the members of the Bailey family, and gifts sent to the Baileys of jewelry and leatherwork crafted by DeSalvo while in prison.

DNA evidence
On July 11, 2013, Boston law enforcement officials announced that DNA evidence had linked DeSalvo to the rape and murder of 19-year-old Mary Sullivan. DeSalvo's remains were exhumed, and the Suffolk District Attorney Daniel F. Conley said he expected investigators to find an exact match when the evidence is compared with his DNA.

On July 19, 2013, Suffolk County DA Daniel F. Conley, Massachusetts Attorney General Martha Coakley and Boston Police Commissioner Edward F. Davis announced that DNA test results proved DeSalvo was the source of seminal fluid recovered at the scene of Sullivan's 1964 murder.

Controversies

Doubts
Though DeSalvo was conclusively linked to Mary Sullivan's murder, doubts remain as to whether he committed all of the Boston Strangler homicides — and whether another killer could still be at large. When he confessed, people who knew him personally did not believe him capable of the crimes. It was also noted that the women allegedly killed by "The Strangler" were of widely varying ages, social status and ethnicities, and that their deaths involved inconsistent modi operandi.

Susan Kelly, an author who has had access to the files of the Commonwealth of Massachusetts' "Strangler Bureau", argued in her book that the murders were the work of several killers, rather than that of a single individual. Another author, former FBI profiler Robert Ressler, has said, "You're putting together so many different patterns [regarding the Boston Strangler murders] that it's inconceivable behaviorally that all these could fit one individual."

In 2000, Elaine Whitfield Sharp, an attorney specializing in forensic cases from Marblehead, Massachusetts, began representing the families of DeSalvo and of Mary A. Sullivan, a 19-year-old who was among the Strangler's final victims in 1964. A former print journalist, Sharp obtained court approval to exhume both Sullivan and DeSalvo for DNA testing, filed several court actions to obtain information and physical evidence from the government, and worked with various film producers to create documentaries so as to better educate the public. Through these efforts, Sharp was able to identify several inconsistencies between DeSalvo's confessions and the crime scene evidence.

For example, DeSalvo did not, as he claimed, strangle Sullivan with his bare hands; instead, she was strangled by ligature. Forensic pathologist Michael Baden noted that DeSalvo incorrectly stated the time of the victim's death—a detail that DeSalvo got wrong in several of the murders, said Susan Kelly. Finally, James Starrs, professor of forensic science at George Washington University, told a news conference that a semen-like substance on her body did not match DeSalvo's DNA and could not associate him with her murder.

The victim's nephew, Casey Sherman, also wrote a book, A Rose for Mary (2003), in which he expanded upon the evidence—and leads from Kelly's book—to conclude that DeSalvo could not be responsible for her death, and to try to determine her killer's identity. Sharp continues to work on the case for the DeSalvo family.

On July 11, 2013, Suffolk County District Attorney Daniel F. Conley stated that DNA testing had revealed a "familial match" between DeSalvo and forensic evidence in the Sullivan killing, leading authorities to request the exhumation of DeSalvo's body in order to provide a definitive forensic link of DeSalvo to the murder of Mary Sullivan. Nine days later, investigators announced that the comparison of crime scene evidence and DeSalvo's DNA "leaves no doubt that Albert DeSalvo was responsible for the brutal murder of Mary Sullivan".

George Nassar
George Nassar, the inmate DeSalvo reportedly confessed to, is among the suspects in the case. He is currently serving a life sentence for the 1967 shooting death of an Andover, Massachusetts, gas station attendant. In 2008 and again in 2009, the Massachusetts Supreme Judicial Court denied Nassar's appeals of his 1967 conviction. In 2006, Nassar argued in court filings that he had been unable to make his case in a previous appeal, because he was in federal prison in Leavenworth, Kansas, in the 1980s and therefore did not have access to Massachusetts legal resources. The court noted that Nassar had returned to Massachusetts in 1983, yet he did not plead his case for more than two decades. Nassar also filed a motion for a new trial in Essex County, which was denied, as was his 2011 petition to the United States Supreme Court for a writ of certiorari.

Ames Robey, a former prison psychiatrist who analyzed both DeSalvo and Nassar, has called Nassar a misogynistic, psychopathic killer and a far more likely suspect in the Strangler murders than DeSalvo. Several followers of the case have also declared Nassar to be the real Strangler, claiming that he fed details of the murders to DeSalvo. DeSalvo, they speculated, knew that he would spend the rest of his life in jail for the "Green Man" attacks, and "confessed" so that Nassar could collect reward money that they would split—thus providing support to DeSalvo's wife and two children. Another motive was his tremendous need for notoriety. DeSalvo hoped that the case would make him world-famous; Robey testified that "Albert so badly wanted to be the Strangler".

In a 1999 interview with The Boston Globe, Nassar denied involvement in the murders, saying that the speculation had destroyed his chances for parole. "I had nothing to do with it", he said, "I'm convicted under the table, behind the scenes."

Other
In 1971, the Texas legislature unanimously passed a resolution honoring DeSalvo for his work in "population control"—after the vote, Waco Representative Tom Moore Jr. admitted that he had submitted the legislation as an April Fool's Day joke against his colleagues—his declared intent was to prove that they pass legislation with no due diligence given to researching the issues beforehand. Having made his point, he withdrew the resolution.

In popular culture
Film
 The 1964 film The Strangler, starring Victor Buono, was based on the Boston Strangler Murders.
 DeSalvo was the subject of the 1968 Hollywood film The Boston Strangler, starring Tony Curtis as DeSalvo, and Henry Fonda and George Kennedy as the homicide detectives who apprehend him. The movie was highly fictionalized. It assumed that DeSalvo was guilty, and portrayed him as someone suffering from multiple personality disorder (MDP) who committed the murders while in a psychotic state. DeSalvo was never diagnosed with, nor even suspected of, having MPD.
 The 2008 movie Boston Strangler: The Untold Story, focused on DeSalvo and told the story of the Boston murders. David Faustino played DeSalvo in the film.
 The 2023 movie Boston Strangler. Told from the point of view of the reporter Loretta McLaughlin played by Keira Knightley. DeSalvo was played by David Dastmalchian.

Music
 The song "Dirty Water", by the Standells, makes a reference to the Boston Strangler.
 The song "The Boston Strangler" by heavy metal band B. F. Raid documents DeSalvo's murders
 Death metal/grindcore band Macabre explains DeSalvo's murders in their song "The Boston Strangler" on their album Sinister Slaughter (1993).
 The song "Midnight Rambler", by the Rolling Stones, makes a reference to the Boston Strangler.

Other
 The artist Mark Morrisroe would frequently claim that he was DeSalvo's illegitimate son.
 In the video game Beholder 2, a major character is named after DeSalvo.

See also 

List of unsolved deaths
Lists of serial killers

References

Further reading
 Albert DeSalvo Papers, Lloyd Sealy Library Special Collections at John Jay College of Criminal Justice (view upon appointment)
 Frank, Gerold. The Boston Strangler. The New American Library, Inc. 1966. .
 Junger, Sebastian. A Death in Belmont. Norton, W. W. & Company, Inc. April 2006. .
 Kelly, Susan. The Boston Stranglers: The Public Conviction of Albert Desalvo and the True Story of Eleven Shocking Murders. Citadel. October 1995. .
 Landay, William. The Strangler. Dell Publishing. January 2007. .
 Rogers, Alan. New England Remembers: The Boston Strangler. Commonwealth Editions. May 2006. .
 Sherman, Casey and Dick Lehr. A Rose for Mary: The Hunt for the Boston Strangler. Northeastern University Press. September 2003. .
 Sherman, Casey and Dick Lehr. Search for the Strangler: My Hunt for Boston's Most Notorious Killer. Grand Central Publishing. April 1, 2005. .

External links
 Albert DeSalvo—The Boston Strangler?
 "Boston Strangler", Encyclopædia Britannica
 The Boston Strangler—Court TV's Crime Library
 
 The Boston Strangler
 Article about Sebastian Junger's Book A Death in Belmont, Time, April 10, 2006
 
 Boston Strangler Poem

1931 births
1973 deaths
1960s murders in the United States
1964 murders in the United States
1973 murders in the United States
20th-century American criminals
American escapees
American male criminals
American military police officers
American people who died in prison custody
American prisoners sentenced to life imprisonment
American rapists
Crime in Massachusetts
Criminals from Massachusetts
Deaths by stabbing in Massachusetts
Escapees from Massachusetts detention
History of Boston
People from Chelsea, Massachusetts
People from Malden, Massachusetts
People murdered in Massachusetts
Prisoners sentenced to life imprisonment by Massachusetts
Prisoners who died in Massachusetts detention
Suspected serial killers
United States Army soldiers
Unsolved murders in the United States
Violence against women in the United States